Ordzhonikidzevsky District is the name of several administrative and municipal districts in Russia. The districts are generally named after Sergo Ordzhonikidze, a Soviet statesman.

Districts of the federal subjects
Ordzhonikidzevsky District, Republic of Khakassia, an administrative and municipal district of the Republic of Khakassia

City divisions
Ordzhonikidzevsky City District, Magnitogorsk, a city district of Magnitogorsk, a city in Chelyabinsk Oblast
Ordzhonikidzevsky City District, Novokuznetsk, a city district of Novokuznetsk, a city in Kemerovo Oblast
Ordzhonikidzevsky City District, Perm, a city district of Perm, the administrative center of Perm Krai
Ordzhonikidzevsky City District, Ufa, a city district of Ufa, the capital of the Republic of Bashkortostan
Ordzhonikidzevsky City District, Yekaterinburg, a city district of Yekaterinburg, the administrative center of Sverdlovsk Oblast

Renamed districts
Ordzhonikidzevsky District, name of Khangalassky District of the Sakha Republic until 1992

See also
Ordzhonikidzevsky (disambiguation)
Ordzhonikidze (disambiguation)

References